Joshua Bush (born July 23, 1980) is a former American football wide receiver in the Arena Football League who played for the Grand Rapids Rampage, Columbus Destroyers, Dallas Desperados, Orlando Predators, and New Orleans VooDoo. He played college football for the Western Michigan Broncos.

References

1980 births
Living people
American football wide receivers
Grand Rapids Rampage players
Columbus Destroyers players
Dallas Desperados players
Orlando Predators players
New Orleans VooDoo players
Western Michigan Broncos football players